Lubostroń  is a village in the administrative district of Gmina Łabiszyn, within Żnin County, Kuyavian-Pomeranian Voivodeship, in north-central Poland.

The village is the location of Skórzewski Palace designed by the leading Polish classicist, Stanisław Zawadzki, in 1800.

References

Villages in Żnin County
Palaces in Poland